The Gardner–Webb Runnin' Bulldogs women's basketball team is the women's basketball team that represents Gardner–Webb University in Boiling Springs, North Carolina, United States.  The school's team currently competes in the Big South Conference.

Postseason

NCAA Division I tournament results
The Runnin' Bulldogs have appeared in two NCAA tournaments. Their record is 0–2.

WNIT results
The Bulldogs have appeared in the Women's National Invitation Tournament (WNIT) once. Their combined record is 1–3.

NCAA Division II tournament results
The Bulldogs made one appearance in the NCAA Division II women's basketball tournament. They had a combined record of 0–1.

References

External links
 

Gardner–Webb Runnin' Bulldogs women's basketball